Goldschneider is a surname, meaning "gold cutter" in the German language. Notable people named Goldschneider include:

Gary Goldschneider (1939–2019), American writer, pianist, composer, and personologist
Jackie Goldschneider, American television personality on The Real Housewives of New Jersey

Jewish surnames
German-language surnames
Yiddish-language surnames